The First United Methodist Church is a church in Leesville, Louisiana.  Located at 202 N. Fifth Street, the building was built in 1920 in a Bungalow style/Craftsman style, Mission style/Spanish Revival style and was added to the National Register of Historic Places in 2002.

The building is a T-shaped church which was built in 1920 and expanded in the 1950s.  It is a two-story building, with the worship space upstairs and a high brick basement story holding offices and meeting rooms.  The front facade of the building has "a pronounced Spanish mission style gable pierced by a curvaceous vent in the Baroque manner."

References

United Methodist churches in Louisiana
Churches on the National Register of Historic Places in Louisiana
Mission Revival architecture in Louisiana
Churches completed in 1920
Churches in Vernon Parish, Louisiana
National Register of Historic Places in Vernon Parish, Louisiana